John Coyne McManus (born 1965) is a military historian, author, and professor of military history at the Missouri University of Science and Technology from St. Louis, Missouri. McManus has published thirteen books on numerous American military history topics, including: the Allied invasion of Normandy, American infantry soldiers, and the 7th Infantry Regiment.

Education 
McManus graduated from the University of Missouri with a degree in sports journalism. After a short career in advertising and sports broadcasting, he earned a Master of Arts degree in American history from the University of Missouri. Soon after, he completed his Ph.D. in American and military history at the University of Tennessee. While working on his Ph.D., McManus participated in the university's Normandy Scholars program, where he studied the Normandy battlefields firsthand.

Career 
McManus served as the assistant director of the Center for the Study of War and Society at the University of Tennessee. In 2000, he accepted a position as an assistant professor of U.S. military history at the Missouri University of Science and Technology. McManus currently serves on the editorial advisory board for World War II magazine and World War II quarterly. He is also the official historian of the 7th Infantry Regiment Association.

McManus was also a guest on The Diane Rehm Show in a broad discussion on the continued significance of D-Day.

Reception 
Some of McManus's works are composed of several personal stories of common footsoldiers on the battlefield, often facing insurmountable challenges, as demonstrated in Grunts and The Dead and Those About to Die.

Reviews of his work have been favorable. His years of research and analysis concerning specific battles such as the Normandy landings has been called "excellent," and that his scenic descriptions are vivid.

Works 
The Deadly Brotherhood : The American Combat Soldier in World War II, Novato, CA: Presidio (1998)  
The Americans at Normandy: The Summer of 1944 — The American War from the Normandy Beaches to Falaise, New York: Forge (2004)  
The Americans at D-Day: The American Experience at the Normandy Invasion, New York: Forge (2005) 
Alamo in the Ardennes: The Untold Story of the American Soldiers Who Made the Defense of Bastogne, Hoboken, N.J. : J. Wiley (2007)  
U.S. Military History For Dummies, Hoboken, N.J. : J. Wiley (2008)  
The 7th Infantry Regiment: Combat in an Age of Terror: The Korean War Through the Present, New York: Forge (2008)  
American Courage, American Carnage: 7th Infantry Chronicles: The 7th Infantry Regiment’s Combat Experience, 1812 Through World War II, New York: Forge (2009)  
Grunts: Inside the American Infantry Combat Experience, World War II Through Iraq, New York: NAL Caliber (2010) 
September Hope: The American Side of a Bridge Too Far, New York: New American Library (2012)  
The Dead and Those About to Die: D-Day : The Big Red One at Omaha Beach, New York: NAL Caliber (2014)  
Fire and Fortitude: The U.S. Army in the Pacific War, 1941 - 1943, New York: Dutton Caliber (2019)

References

External links 
 
 Presentation of Grunts: Inside the American Infantry Combat Experience, World War II Through Iraq at the Pritzker Military Museum and Library
 "The Man Who Took Omaha Beach" article by John C McManus
 Interview with John C. McManus regarding The Dead and Those About to Die at the Pritzker Military Museum and Library
 The Big Red One on D-Day: Televised discussion at the Pritzker Military Museum & Library
  McManus' Facebook Page
  McManus' Faculty Page at Missouri S&T

American military writers
American military historians
American male non-fiction writers
University of Tennessee alumni
University of Missouri alumni
Missouri University of Science and Technology faculty
Writers from St. Louis
Living people
1965 births